Bacosides are a class of chemical compounds isolated from Bacopa monnieri.  Chemically, they are dammarane-type triterpenoid saponins.

There are at least twelve known members of the class.

See also
 Bacoside A

References

Saponins
Triterpene glycosides